Borówek may refer to the following places in Poland:
Borówek, Lower Silesian Voivodeship (south-west Poland)
Borówek, Lublin Voivodeship (east Poland)
Borówek, Łódź Voivodeship (central Poland)
Borówek, Gmina Latowicz in Masovian Voivodeship (east-central Poland)
Borówek, Gmina Siennica in Masovian Voivodeship (east-central Poland)